USS LST-484 was an  built for the United States Navy during World War II.

Construction
LST-485 was laid down on 17 December 1942, under Maritime Commission (MARCOM) contract, MC hull 1005, by  Kaiser Shipyards, Yard No. 4, Richmond, California; launched on 9 January 1943; and commissioned on 19 May 1943.

Service history 

During World War II, LST-485 was assigned to the Asiatic-Pacific Theater and participated in the following operations: the Vella-Lavella occupation in September 1943; the Treasury Island landings in November 1943; the Capture and occupation of Saipan June and August 1944; the Capture and occupation of Tinian in July and August 1944; and the Assault and occupation of Okinawa Gunto from May to June 1945.

Post-war service
Following the war, LST-485 saw China service in January and February 1946, and performed occupation duty in the Far East until early March 1946. Upon her return to the United States, she was decommissioned on 30 July 1946, and struck from the Navy list on 28 August 1946. On 29 March 1948, she was sold to Kaiser Steel, Seattle, Washington, and subsequently scrapped.

Awards
LST-485 earned five battle stars for World War II service.

Notes 

Citations

Bibliography 

Online resources

External links

 

1943 ships
Ships built in Richmond, California
LST-1-class tank landing ships of the United States Navy
World War II amphibious warfare vessels of the United States
S3-M2-K2 ships